Fany Mabel Gauto Caballero (born 19 August 1992) is a Paraguayan professional footballer who plays as a midfielder for Brazilian Série A1 club SC Internacional and the Paraguay women's national team.

International career
Gauto represented Paraguay at the 2012 South American U-20 Women's Championship. At senior level, she played the 2014 Copa América Femenina.

References

External links

1992 births
Living people
Women's association football midfielders
Women's association football forwards
Paraguayan women's footballers
People from San Pedro Department, Paraguay
Paraguay women's international footballers
Club Olimpia footballers
Sportivo Luqueño players
Maccabi Holon F.C. (women) players
Cúcuta Deportivo footballers
Atlético Huila (women) players
Associação Ferroviária de Esportes (women) players
Ligat Nashim players
Campeonato Brasileiro de Futebol Feminino Série A1 players
Paraguayan expatriate women's footballers
Paraguayan expatriate sportspeople in Israel
Expatriate women's footballers in Israel
Paraguayan expatriate sportspeople in Colombia
Expatriate women's footballers in Colombia
Paraguayan expatriate sportspeople in Brazil
Expatriate women's footballers in Brazil